The discography of Weezer, an American rock band, consists of 15 studio albums, two compilation albums, one video album, nine extended plays, 37 singles and 40 music videos. Weezer's self-titled debut studio album, often referred to as The Blue Album, was released in May 1994 through DGC Records. The album was a commercial success, peaking at number 16 on the US Billboard 200 and spawning the singles "Undone – The Sweater Song" and "Buddy Holly", both of which were responsible for launching Weezer into mainstream success with the aid of music videos directed by Spike Jonze. It has sold 3.3 million copies in the United States and has been certified triple platinum by the Recording Industry Association of America (RIAA), becoming the band's best selling album to date. Following the success of their debut album, Weezer took a break from touring for the Christmas holidays. Lead singer Rivers Cuomo began piecing together demo material for Weezer's second studio album. Cuomo's original concept for the album was a space-themed rock opera, Songs from the Black Hole. Ultimately, the Songs from the Black Hole album concept was dropped; the band, however, continued to utilize songs from these sessions into work for their second studio album. Pinkerton was released as the band's second studio album in September 1996. Peaking at number 19 on the Billboard 200, it was considered a critical and commercial failure at the time of its release, selling far less than its triple platinum predecessor. However, in the years following its release, it has seen much critical and commercial championing.

Following a hiatus after the release of Pinkerton, Weezer returned to critical and commercial prominence in May 2001 with the release of their third studio album, a second self-titled album, commonly referred to as The Green Album. Peaking at number four on the Billboard 200, the album was certified platinum by the RIAA. Three singles were released from the album: "Hash Pipe", "Island in the Sun" and "Photograph", all of which reached the top 25 on the US Billboard Alternative Songs chart. A year later, the band released their fourth studio album Maladroit to positive reviews. The album peaked at number three on the Billboard 200 and was certified gold by the RIAA. "Dope Nose" and "Keep Fishin'", the album's two singles, both reached the top 15 on the Alternative Songs chart. In May 2005, the band released their fifth studio album, Make Believe. Despite receiving mixed reviews from critics, the album was a commercial success, peaking at number two on the Billboard 200 and being certified platinum by the RIAA. It spawned four singles, including the international hit "Beverly Hills", which became the band's first top ten hit on the US Billboard Hot 100 and the top-selling download of 2005.

The band's third self-titled studio album – commonly referred to as The Red Album – was released in June 2008 as their sixth studio album. The album peaked at number four on the Billboard 200. The first single from the album, "Pork and Beans", spent 11 weeks at the top of the Alternative Songs chart. Two of the three succeeding singles from the album, "Troublemaker" and "The Greatest Man That Ever Lived (Variations on a Shaker Hymn)", peaked at numbers two and 35 on the chart respectively. Raditude, the band's seventh studio album, was released in November 2009 and peaked at number 7 on the Billboard 200. It was preceded by the release of its lead single, "(If You're Wondering If I Want You To) I Want You To", which peaked at number two on the Alternative Songs chart. Weezer released Hurley, their eighth studio album, in September 2010. The album, their first to be released through Epitaph Records, peaked at number six on the Billboard 200 and spawned two singles, "Memories" and "Hang On". Shortly after releasing Hurley, the band released a compilation album titled Death to False Metal in November 2010. An album consisting of previously unreleased tracks recorded at several points throughout Weezer's career, Death to False Metal peaked at number 48 on the Billboard 200. Worldwide album sales have been verified through RIAA and Geffen Records.

Albums

Studio albums

Compilation albums

Video releases

Extended plays

Singles

1990s–2000s

2010s–2020s

Promotional singles

Other charted songs

Guest appearances

Music videos

Notes

References
General
 

Specific

External links
 Official website
 Weezer at AllMusic
 
 

Discography
Rock music group discographies
Discographies of American artists
Alternative rock discographies